Senator Gillmor may refer to:

Senate of Canada
Arthur Hill Gillmor (1824–1903), Senator from New Brunswick from 1900 to 1903
Daniel Gillmor (1849–1918), Senate from New Brunswick from 1907 to 1918

United States state senate members
Karen Gillmor (born 1948), Ohio State Senate
Paul Gillmor (1939–2007), Ohio State Senate

Other uses
Senator Gilmore (disambiguation)